WHYR-LP (96.9 FM) (sometimes pronounced "wire") is a radio station licensed to Baton Rouge, Louisiana, United States. The LP stands for low power broadcasting.  The station began broadcasting on June 24, 2011, in a testing phase.  As of July 2011, the station is playing a loop of prerecorded music as planning continues for future programming, including shows covering topics like politics, local music, food and drink, as well as nationally syndicated shows from Pacifica Radio like Democracy Now! and more.  The station is owned by Baton Rouge Progressive Network.

Station Timeline
 June 2000: Baton Rouge Progressive Network (BRPN) applies to the Federal Communications Commission (FCC) to operate a low power FM radio station.
 September 2004: FCC awards BRPN with a construction permit and assigns the call letters WHYR‐LP.
 November 2005: An unaffiliated entity, who also applied for a permit in 2000 but did not receive one, files unauthorized documents with the FCC to transfer control of WHYR‐LP to them.
 March 2006: BRPN becomes aware of the unauthorized transfer and alerts the FCC.
 January 2010: The FCC fines the unauthorized entity and returns control of WHYR‐LP to BRPN.
 February 2011: BRPN forms the Radio Advisory Council (RAC) to make managerial and operational decisions related to the station.
 February 2011: A transmission site is secured.
 March 2011: Antenna purchased.
 April 2011: Transmitter and STL equipment purchased. The website http://www.whyr.org is launched.
 June 2011: Leased 1623 Main Street in Baton Rouge as site for studio. On June 24, 2011: began broadcasting.

References

External links
 WHYR website
 

Radio stations in Louisiana
Low-power FM radio stations in Louisiana
Radio stations established in 2000